Chisimba Falls, also Chishimba Falls is a series of waterfalls located in Kasama District, in the Northern Province of Zambia. The waterfalls host the Chishimba Hydroelectric Power Station. The scenic views around the falls, together with a museum under development, are major tourist attractions.

Location
The geographical coordinates of Chishimba Falls are: 10°06'30.0"S, 30°55'03.0"E (Latitude:-10.108333; Longitude:30.917500).

Overview
The waterfall complex comprises three separate waterfalls spread over a distance of about  along the Luombe River, as it flows in a general north to south direction. The upper falls are called Mutumuna Falls. The lower falls are the main Chishimba Fall, where the river drops another estimated .

Local attractions

A hydro-electric power plant, the 15 MW Chishimba Hydroelectric Power Station, that is owned and operated by ZESCO, is located at these falls. First commissioned in 1959, as a 0.9 MW installation, the power station was expanded to 6 MW in 1971. In the early 2020s the capacity of this mini-hydropower plant is under expansion to 15 megawatts.

The Chishimba Falls belong to the Monuments and Historic Sites of Zambia.

See also
 List of power stations in Zambia

References

Notes
 Leaflet "Chishimba falls", National Heritage Conservation Commission, 2009
 Zambia's waterfall Wonderland: Zambia Tourism  
 The Geographical Journal, Vol 86, No 4 (Oct 1935), pp. 356–357: 
 

Waterfalls of Zambia
Geography of Northern Province, Zambia
Tourist attractions in Northern Province, Zambia